Tortoli may refer to:-

Places
Tortolì, Sardinia.

Ships
ST Tortoli, a tug in service with Societa Salvataggi Sicilian from 1963 to 1968.